This is a list of the main career statistics of Czech professional tennis player Petra Kvitová. To date, Kvitová has won 29 career singles titles including two Grand Slam singles titles at the Wimbledon Championships, one WTA Tour Championships singles title, three WTA Premier Mandatory singles titles and five WTA Premier 5 singles titles. She was also the Bronze at the 2016 Rio Olympics, a runner-up at the 2015 WTA Finals and 2019 Australian Open, a semifinalist at the 2010 Wimbledon Championships, 2012 Australian Open, 2012 French Open and 2020 French Open, and a quarterfinalist at the 2011 Australian Open, 2012 Wimbledon Championships, 2013 Wimbledon Championships, 2015 US Open, 2017 US Open and 2020 Australian Open. Kvitová reached her career-high ranking of world No. 2 on 31 October 2011.

Performance timeline

Only main-draw results in WTA Tour, Grand Slam tournaments, Fed Cup/Billie Jean King Cup and Olympic Games are included in win–loss records.

Singles
Current after the 2023 Indian Wells Open.

Doubles

Grand Slam finals

Singles: 3 (2 titles, 1 runner-up)

Other significant finals

WTA Finals

Singles: 2 (1 title, 1 runner-up)

WTA Elite Trophy

Singles: 1 (1 title)

WTA 1000

Singles: 12 (8 titles, 4 runner-ups)

WTA career finals

Singles: 40 (29 titles, 11 runner-ups)

National representation

Fed Cup

Hopman Cup

ITF Circuit finals

Singles: 10 (7 titles, 3 runner-ups)

Olympic Games

Singles: 1 (bronze medal)

Fed Cup/Billie Jean King Cup

Singles: 40 (30–10)

Doubles: 1 (0–1)

WTA ranking
Current after the 2023 Australian Open.

WTA Tour career earnings 
Current after the 2023 Dubai Championships.

Longest winning streaks

14 match win streak (2011–2012)

14 match win streak (2018)

Career Grand Slam tournament statistics

Best Grand Slam tournament results details
Grand Slam winners are in boldface, and runner–ups are in italics.

Grand Slam tournament seedings
The tournaments won by Kvitová are in boldface, and advanced into finals by Kvitová are in italics.

Record against other players

No. 1 wins

Record against top 10 players 

 She has a 62–70 record against players who were, at the time the match was played, ranked in the top 10.

Double bagel matches (6–0, 6–0)

Notes

References

External links 
 
 
 

Career Statistics
Tennis career statistics